Krasny Oktyabr is a rural locality (a selo) and the administrative center of Krasnooktyabrskoye Rural Settlement, Belgorodsky District, Belgorod Oblast, Russia. The population was 2,550 as of 2010. There are 30 streets.

References

External Links 
 Evan Simko-Bednarski. Ukraine appears to strike back for first time with missile hit on Russian military camp. The New York Post. March 29, 2022
 Shell hits military camp in Russia, most likely from Ukrainian side - Tass. Reuters. March 29, 2022

Rural localities in Belgorodsky District
Belgorodsky Uyezd